Dajjal: The Slayer and His Followers is a 2018 conspiracy-thriller animated film about the current Middle East crises written and directed by Rana Abrar. The plot follows an ancient plan for a dominating kingdom to control the world and the actions taken to save the world from global annihilation.

Plot 
Four young boys select a crazed person to create a peacekeeping program to protect the world from the conspiracy theory of Dajjal's followers who are waiting for a fake messenger who will rule the world as an only monarch and build up a world government to effectively complete and destroy all world religions.

Production 
The film's final title was announced in November 2016. The key animation and artwork for the movie began on 30 February 2017. The first trailer was released on 3 May 2017 and the second trailer was released on 19 January 2018.

Release 
The film had its worldwide release in December 2018. The duration of the movie is 100 minutes. The film was released in 6 Languages: English, Arabic, Turkish, Malay, Indonesian and Urdu.

See also 

 List of Pakistani animated films

References

External links 
 
 

2018 thriller films
2018 films
2018 animated films
2010s adventure drama films
Animated adventure films
Animated drama films
2010s Arabic-language films
Emirati animated films
Emirati adventure films
Epic films based on actual events
Films about religion
Films set in Dubai
India–Pakistan relations in popular culture
Indonesian animated films
2010s Indonesian-language films
Islamic animated films
Malay-language films
Pakistani 3D films
Pakistani animated films
Pakistani animation
2010s Turkish-language films
2010s Urdu-language films
War films based on actual events
2018 multilingual films
Emirati multilingual films
Indonesian multilingual films
Malaysian multilingual films
Pakistani multilingual films
Turkish multilingual films